Miss Grand Myanmar 2024 will be the second edition of the Miss Grand Myanmar beauty pageant, scheduled to be held in Yangon in early 2024. Contestants who have qualified through either the regional preliminary pageants or the casting process will compete for the right to represent Myanmar in the Miss Grand International 2024 pageant.

Background
In 2023, after two years of obtaining the Miss Grand Myanmar license, Glamorous International began franchising the regional competitions to individual organizers, who would name regional, state, district, or city titleholders to compete in the 2024 national pageant. The first regional preliminary pageant was held on January 22, 2023, in Mandalay, in which five district representatives, including Mandalay, Amarapura, Kyaukse, Pyin Oo Lwin, and Sagaing, were determined, followed by Yangon Region's contest in March.

The following is a list of the main sub-events of the Miss Grand Myanmar 2024 pageant.

Selection of participants
The following is a list of the regions or states that held the local preliminary contests for the Miss Grand Myanmar 2024 pageant.

Candidates
As of March 2023, 13 contestants have been confirmed to participate.

References

External links

Grand Myanmar
Miss Grand Myanmar